Ginji (written: ,  or ) is a masculine Japanese given name. Notable people with the name include:

, Japanese baseball player
, Japanese footballer
, Japanese Noh actor

Fictional characters
, a character in the manga series GetBackers
, a character in the manga series Black Lagoon
Ginji Kyuma - a character in Alice in Borderland

Japanese masculine given names